Hendersonville High School is one of three public high schools located in Hendersonville, Sumner County, Tennessee. The principal is Bob Cotter, a former principal for the alternative school, R.T. Fisher, and Hawkins Middle School. It is part of Sumner County Schools. Two middle schools feed into Hendersonville High: Ellis Middle School and Hawkins Middle School.

The school's colors have been black and gold ever since the first Commando football team in 1941, when the Vanderbilt University football  program provided the first Commando football team with older, used jerseys. The black and gold colors have remained ever since.  Hendersonville is known as the Commandos because 54 men were sent to fight in World War II. When they came back as veteran commandos the name stuck with the school and became the official mascot.

Hendersonville participates in 6A level sports as a part of the Tennessee Secondary School Athletic Association, and maintains athletic programs including track, swimming, softball, bowling, baseball, wrestling, golf, hockey, soccer, football, cross country, marching band, and basketball. The school has rivalries with  Gallatin High School, Beech High School and Station Camp High School.

Taylor Swift attended until she left the school to begin homeschooling on her tour bus. The school's auditorium was renamed "Taylor Swift Auditorium" in Swift's honor after she contributed funds to refurbish the lighting and sound equipment.

Family Circle magazine gave Hendersonville High School a gold star for 315 seniors who logged around 20,000 hours of community service. Academically, Hendersonville has a 9/10 rating on greatschools.net.

Athletics
Sports and state titles:
Baseball
Boys' Basketball
Girls' Basketball
Boys'Bowling 2002, 2003, 2004
Girls' Bowling 2008, 2009
 Cheerleading 1997, 1998, 2001, 2008, 2013, 2014, 2018, 2019
Boys' Cross Country
Girls' Cross Country
Football 
Golden Girls Dance Team 
Boys' Golf 2010, 2011, 2012, 2014
Girls' Golf 
Boys' Soccer 1989, 1998, 2010
Girls' Soccer
Softball
Boys' Tennis 
Girls' Tennis
Boys' Track 1974, 1975,  1976, 1989, 1990
Girls' Track 1985, 1993, 2004, 2005
Wrestling 1993, 2004, 2006
Dual Wrestling
Girls' Wrestling
Volleyball

Football
Hendersonville's home football games are held at Paul Decker Field. The on-campus stadium is named after retired principal Paul Decker, and has a capacity of 5,500 spectators. Before home games, players walk around the field in what is known as the "Commando Walk". In inclement weather, the Commandos practice in the Steven Chaussey field house, a 60 by 40 yard (55 m by 37 m) practice facility. They also work out in their workout facility called the "Iron Bunker".

Cheerleading
They have four National Championships.

Soccer

The Hendersonville High School boys' soccer team has won five Tennessee State Championships: 1983, 1986, 1989, 1998, and 2010. Hendersonville Soccer also has a soccer-specific facility, called "The Field of Dreams", located in Drakes Creek Park.

Swimming
Hendersonville High School swimming has had over 37 swimming All-American performances over the past decade. Swimming has produced more All-Americans than all other sports combined at Hendersonville High School.

Ice hockey
The HHS Ice Hockey team has been in existence since the year of 2000. The first coach was Chris Morris, who was followed by the current coach Tim Rathert. The team finished 23-15-0 last season.

The HHS Commandos have qualified for the state tournament, the Predator's Cup, for the past five years. They play in the Greater Nashville Area Scholastic Hockey league. In 2011, they represented GNASH and state of Tennessee at the USA Hockey High School national tournament, held in Salt Lake City, Utah.

Notable alumni

Max T. Barnes, songwriter, record producer, studio musician
Josh Berry, NASCAR driver
Carlene Carter, singer-songwriter, daughter of June Carter Cash

Zac Curtis, pitcher for the Texas Rangers
DeWayne Dotson, retired football player, linebacker, selected by Dallas Cowboys in Round 4 of 1994 NFL Draft
Steven Fox, golfer, 2012 U.S. Amateur champion
Jeff Jarrett, professional wrestler, founder of TNA Wrestling 
Lennon Murphy, songwriter, singer, producer
Rachael Price, lead singer of band Lake Street Dive
Thomas Richardson aka, Tommy "Wildfire" Rich,
Zach Stafford, journalist and Tony Award-winning producer 
Taylor Swift, Grammy Award-winning singer-songwriter
Thomas Wesley Pentz (Diplo), record producer, DJ; attended Hendersonville High School for two years
James Wilhoit, professional football kicker for the Kansas City Command of  Arena Football League, former University of Tennessee kicker
Joejuan Williams, professional football defensive back for the New England Patriots.

References

External links
Official school website

Public high schools in Tennessee
Schools in Sumner County, Tennessee